Gmina Stoczek Łukowski is a rural gmina (administrative district) in Łuków County, Lublin Voivodeship, in eastern Poland. Its seat is the town of Stoczek Łukowski, although the town is not part of the territory of the gmina.

Villages
Gmina Stoczek Łukowski contains the villages and settlements of Aleksandrówka, Błażejki, Borki, Celej, Guzówka, Jagodne, Jamielne, Jamielnik-Kolonia, Januszówka, Jedlanka, Kamionka, Kapice, Kienkówka, Kisielsk, Łosiniec, Mizary, Nowa Prawda, Nowe Kobiałki, Nowy Jamielnik, Rosy, Róża Podgórna, Ruda, Stara Prawda, Stara Róża, Stare Kobiałki, Stary Jamielnik, Szyszki, Toczyska, Turzec, Wiśniówka, Wola Kisielska, Wólka Poznańska, Wólka Różańska, Zabiele and Zgórznica.

Neighbouring gminas
Gmina Stoczek Łukowski is bordered by the town of Stoczek Łukowski and by the gminas of Borowie, Domanice, Łuków, Miastków Kościelny, Stanin, Wodynie and Wola Mysłowska.

References
Polish official population figures 2006

Stoczek Lukowski
Łuków County